Nepali Congress's Liberation Army(Congress Mukti Sena) was the militant wing of the Nepali Congress Party. Established in 1944 the Sena took part in an armed uprising against the Rana rule in Nepal. Later, the Liberation Army was integrated into the Nepali Police, following the 'Delhi Compromise'.

See also
Ram Prasad Rai 
Nepali Congress

References

Military wings of political parties
Liberation
Paramilitary organisations based in Nepal
Rana regime
1944 establishments in Nepal